Sidi Ali is a district in Mostaganem Province, Algeria. It was named after its capital, Sidi Ali.

Municipalities
The district is further divided into 4 municipalities:
Sidi Ali
Tagzait
Ouled Malah

Districts of Mostaganem Province